Telecommunications infrastructure in South Africa  provides modern and efficient service to urban areas, including cellular and internet services. The Independent Communications Authority of South Africa (ICASA) is the watchdog of the telecommunications in the country.

In 1997, Telkom, the South African telecommunications parastatal, was partly privatised and entered into a strategic equity partnership with a consortium of two companies, including SBC, a U.S. telecommunications company. In exchange for exclusivity (a monopoly) to provide certain services for 5 years, Telkom assumed an obligation to facilitate network modernisation and expansion into the unserved areas.

A Second Network Operator was to be licensed to compete with Telkom across its spectrum of services in 2002, although this license was only officially handed over in late 2005 and has recently begun operating under the name, Neotel.

South Africa has four licensed mobile operators: MTN, Vodacom (majority owned by the UK’s Vodafone), Cell C (75% owned by Saudi Oger, an international telecommunications holdings firm), and 8ta, a subsidiary of Telkom. In 2012, mobile penetration was estimated at more than 10%, one of the highest rates in the world. In 2019, mobile penetration reached 95%.

Mobile market in South Africa is controlled by four cellular providers: Vodacom, MTN, Cell C, Telkom (Mobile), which is run by Telkom, With Vodacom and MTN controlling the 75% of the market share, ICASA considers that mobile brand services are highly concentrated in the country. a new provider, Rain launched in 2018 providing majority data only services to consumers.

History 

The first use of telecommunication in the Republic of South Africa was a single line telegraph connecting Cape Town and Simonstown. The first telegraph was launched on 2 December 1859, and the Cape of Good Hope Telegraph Company opened the line in April 1860.

At about the time of the Bell Telephone Company's development of the telephone industry post-1876, early undersea telegraph links were introduced, first connecting Durban and Europe, and later connecting the country to the rest of the world. In 1879, the first submarine cable system that connected South Africa with Europe started to work, through the East Coast cable of the South African Telegraph Company, a single channel cable.

In 1889, the first West Coast submarine cable from Cape Town to Europe was installed. The 1584 nm cable provided by CS Scotia was linked with West African Telegraph Companies' cables. Telcon carried out the links. Another cable to Cape Town was laid in 1899 during the Second Boer War, this time from Ascension Island, by the Eastern Telegraph Company (later Cable & Wireless plc).

In the mid-twentieth century undersea telephone cables were also commissioned. In 1968, the SAT-1 cable was laid. It connected from Melkbosstrand, South Africa to Sesimbra, Portugal.

The network continued to develop through internal financing in a heavily regulated market as international technology developed.  At this point, telephone services were operated by the South African Post Office. In the 1960s, South Africa was connected to 72 nations and total outgoing annual international calls numbered over 28,800.

Telkom was incorporated on 30 September 1991 as a public limited liability company registered under the South African Companies Act, 61 of 1973, as amended.

In 1993 GSM was demonstrated for the first time in Africa at Telkom '93 in Cape Town. In 1994 the first GSM networks in Africa were launched in South Africa.

In 1994, South Africa launched a mobile operations, underwritten by Telkom in partnership with Vodafone, with 36,000 active customer on the network. This subsidiary grew to be Vodacom, which Telkom sold in late 2008 in preference for its own 3G network. Vodacom has a subscriber base of more than R45M, with an average revenue per user of more than R60 across both rural and urban subscribers. Vodacom, together with the other operators, have come under criticism in late 2009 by government and the public for high interconnect charges. This issue was currently being discussed by the Parliamentary Committee on Telecommunications.

The first public videoconference between the continent of Africa and North America occurred on 24 June 1995 (2:00-3:00 p.m. PST). The Cybersafari Digital Be-In and Internet Love-Fest linked a technology fair at Fort Mason in San Francisco with a techno "rave" and cyber-deli in Woodstock, Cape Town. For one hour, members of the public communicated with each other via a simple Picturetel system using a 128kb ISDN line. "Cognitive dissident" and communications activist David Robert Lewis initiated the video conference and peacecast on the San Francisco side, and Freddie Bell answered the call in Woodstock, Cape Town. Because of different ISDN standards, a video bridge via Boston was used to achieve the link, which also featured interactive dancing. Organisations which took credit were technology sponsors Picturetel and Telkom, plus Peacecast organisers Unity 95, Parallel University, Vortex, Creativity Cafe and line producer "Cybersafari to Africa".

In 2004, the Department of Communications redefined the Electronics Communications Act, which consolidated and redefined the landscape of telecommunications licensing in South Africa (both mobile and fixed). The Independent Communications Authority (ICASA) currently licenses more than 400 independent operators with the Electronic Communications Network License (with the ability to self-provision) as well as issuing Electronic Communications Service Licenses for service deployment over infrastructure in the retail domain.

Telkom is no longer the single operator in South Africa, and faces competition from the second Fixed Network Operator Licensee, Neotel, as well as the four mobile operators, Vodacom, MTN, Cell-C and Rain. However, it still receives criticisms (see later) from smaller operators and the Competition Commission for setting South African broadband pricing in its favour.

In 2020, MTN, Vodacom and Rain launched 5G network in South Africa.

Television 

Four main television stations are available to the public. These are namely SABC 1, SABC 2, SABC 3 and eTV. Other community-based stations are also on offer, such as Soweto TV and Cape Town TV (ctv).

DStv is currently South Africa's only operating and Africa's largest satellite television provider. The company provides over 100 video and over 78 audio channels, and in 2008 introduced its first HD video channel. Since then an additional five HD channels have been introduced  - namely M-Net HD, SuperSport HD, Discovery HD, SuperSport HD 2, M-Net Movies 1 HD and SuperSport HD 3.

In 2008, additional pay-TV licenses were granted to various companies in South Africa. As of January 2010, none of the companies granted a license have begun providing services. However, On Digital Media (ODM), have stated that they are on track to begin sale of their product in May 2010, and that prices will be significantly cheaper than their competitor DStv. In 2012, DSTV now has added 8 more channels all for movies.

Internet 

Although expensive compared to more developed nations, broadband is easily obtainable in South Africa. Fixed line options such as ADSL, ISDN, Diginet and Leased Lines are available from the national operator Telkom. Recently, legislation was passed by government allowing all licensed telecommunications providers to build their own fixed line networks, resulting in a scramble by companies such as Vodacom, MTN South Africa and Neotel to construct their own country and citywide fibre-optic networks. Individual South African cities such as Cape Town, Durban, Johannesburg and Pretoria are also in the process of, or have completed construction of city-owned fibre-optic networks. These will provide services to city and government-owned establishments, and will act as an extra source of income through the sale of excess bandwidth mainly to companies.

Wireless options are available from Sentech, iBurst, Vodacom, MTN, Cell C, Telkom and a number of other ISP's. They typically provide speeds of up to 7.6 Mbit/s with HSDPA. HSUPA is also available. MTN South Africa was among the first mobile networks in the world to offer HSDPA services to its customers. Satellite options are available from both Sentech and Telkom.

A SNO, Neotel, has been licensed in South Africa and is currently offering a wireless service in selected areas. According to Neotel, up-take of its services has exceeded expectations, and as a result Neotel are rapidly expanding services throughout major metropolitan areas in South Africa. In 2009, SEACOM - the second undersea cable to land in South Africa - jointly owned and operated by Neotel - was switched on. Neotel have stated that sale of SEACOM bandwidth, too, has exceeded expectations, and will drive the continual downward-spiral of internet prices in the country. As of January 2010, South Africa has over 2 million broadband subscribers. Whilst this is the largest number in Africa, South Africa's broadband penetration of 4% is significantly below international standards.

Broadband

ADSL
In late 2009, Telkom began trialling 8 and 12 Mbit/s ADSL offerings. In August 2010, Telkom officially introduced ADSL at 10 Mbit/s. More than 20,000 4Mbit/s subscribers were upgraded free of charge. As of October 2018, fixed line DSL speeds on offer range between 2 Mbit/s to 40 Mbit/s.

Fibre to the home (FTTH)
Currently Openserve (a division of Telkom), Vumatel, MTN, and Broadband Infraco are among the providers rolling out fibre to the home (FTTH) networks across major cities and towns.

There are also about a dozen other small providers rolling out mostly to gated estates and neighbourhoods. These networks are open access wholesale last mile networks meaning that you have to purchase a package from an internet service provider (ISP) such as Vox, Webafrica, Axxess, or Telkom. Openserve, which is 51.4% government-owned, currently has the largest footprint covering areas in many smaller cities and towns that include Bloemfontein, Port Elizabeth, and Knysna. Most of these providers offer additional high-end business services such as web hosting.  The rollout has been rapid. Speeds range from 4/1 Mbit/s to 1000/1000 Mbit/s. A 100/50 Mbit/s plan will cost R900 to R1050 (US$ to $) depending on providers available in area and size of data package. An unlimited 1 Gbit/s/1 Gbit/s plan will cost around R1700 ($) so prices are still somewhat expensive when compared to other countries with FTTH but prices have been continually falling throughout the rollout. Comparatively, Google Fiber charges consumers $70 for an unlimited (uncapped) 1000/400 Mbit/s in the US.

Pricing

Broadband services are well above the world average. Charges consist of three parts: the ADSL line rental (costs range from R169 for 2 Mbit/s, R389 for 8Mbit/s, and R555 for 40Mbit/s line access), the analogue phone line rental (R157, as of August 2013, which includes a landline number) and an ISP account. The price of an ISP account can vary greatly, ranging from R109 ($) for 100 GB to R4099 ($) for 4 TB. Uncapped 1 Mbit/s ISP accounts start at R57 ($) and can range up to R817 ($) for uncapped 40 Mbit/s.

Wireless 

There is a distinction between wireless broadband and mobile broadband, the local GSM operators (and their surrogates) provide GSM (up to LTE) broadband.

A number of companies offer broadband alternatives. Iburst offer their namesake, while cellular network company Cell C offer GPRS and EDGE and more recently a 21.1 Mbit/s service. MTN and Vodacom also offer 3G with up to 21.1 Mbit/s HSDPA+. Telkom offers a 7.2/2.4 Mbit/s HSDPA/HSUPA service in Gauteng. Most of these offerings are more expensive than ADSL for mid-to-high usage, but can be cost effective if low usage is required. MTN triggered a price war in late February 2007, offering 2 GB for each 1 GB bought, with Iburst giving a small "data bonus" to their contract customers and Sentech also reducing their prices. Vodacom responded with dramatic price cuts of their own on 1 April 2007, after which Cell C reduced prices on their larger offerings to undercut both MTN and Vodacom.

Internet hotspots are ubiquitous in hotels, coffee shops, and the like. This enables users—often tourists or people on the move—to easily go online without having to enter into a fixed contract with an ISP. Many hotspots offer usage free of charge, though frequently only after registration and/or for a limited amount of time or data.

Voice over Internet protocol (VoIP) 
Until 1 February 2005, the usage of VoIP outside of company networks was illegal under South African communications law, ostensibly to protect jobs. The deregulation of VoIP was announced by former Minister of Communications Ivy Matsepe-Casaburri in September 2004.

1G 
1G used to be offered by Vodacom, MTN, Cell C and Telkom. Since then all 1G cell towers in South Africa have been repurposed as 2G, 3G, 4G or 5G infrastructure or decommissioned.

2G 
South Africa offers GSM 900 and GSM 1800 with almost 99% coverage. So far Vodacom has shown interest in turning off their 2G network, but it is still operating today

3G 
South Africa offers UMTS 900 and UMTS 2100 with 99.7% of the population having coverage.

4G/LTE 
South Africa offers LTE 1800, LTE 2100 and LTE 2300.

LTE Coverage by carrier 2020

5G 
Carriers Vodacom and MTN both offer 5G 3500 and launched in Johannesburg and Cape Town.

See also

Digital Divide in South Africa
Internet censorship in South Africa

References

External links 
 
 Neotel
 SA Telecoms and Communications News